Alpaslan Ayan (born 4 May 1966) is a Turkish judoka. He competed iat the 1984, 1988 and the 1992 Summer Olympics.

References

1966 births
Living people
Turkish male judoka
Olympic judoka of Turkey
Judoka at the 1984 Summer Olympics
Judoka at the 1988 Summer Olympics
Judoka at the 1992 Summer Olympics
Place of birth missing (living people)
20th-century Turkish people